Tembiligala may refer to the following villages in Sri Lanka
Tembiligala Pallegama 
Tembiligala Udagama